Lion Pride is a 2017 Taiwanese television series created and produced by Eastern Television. Starring Yen Tsao, Amanda Chou, Kevin Liu and Peace Yang as the main cast. Filming began in October 2017 and ended on February 12, 2018. The first original broadcast was on TTV every Saturday at 10:00 pm starting December 2, 2017.

Synopsis
Two teachers hold polar opposite viewpoints about teaching and life. Wang Qiang Da is a mathematics teacher who approaches everything in front of him with logic and reasoning. Wang Qiang Wei is a history teacher at the same tutoring center who cares about the love of learning and making people happy around her.

When Qiang Da and Qiang Wei are brought together by a crime, they must work together to get to the bottom of what happened. What will they discover about themselves in the process?

Cast

Main cast
Yen Tsao 曹晏豪 as Wang Qiang Da 王強大
Max Kuo 郭大睿 as child Qiang Da
Amanda Chou 周曉涵 as Wang Qiang Wei / Wang Qiao Wei 汪薔薇 / 汪巧薇
Cai Hai Yin 蔡海殷 as child Qiao Wei
Kevin Liu 劉書宏 as Tie Bu Fan (Xiao Tie) 鐵不凡 (小鐵)
Peace Yang 陽靚 as Lian Si De 連四德
Song Ting Yi 宋亭頤 as child Si De

Supporting cast

Kenny Wen 溫國祥 as Chen Yu Fei (Ah Fei) 陳雲飛 (阿飛)
Chao Tzu Chiang 趙自強 as Yan Zhang Tai 嚴長泰
Xiang Cheng Yu 向承寓 as young Zhang Tai
Vince Kao 高英軒 as Zhang Ding Xuan 詹定宣
Huang Guan Zhi 黃冠智 as young Ding Xuan
Wang Tzu-Chiang 王自強 as Li Da Shi 李大世
Nolay Piho 林慶台 as Lin Shang Xun 林尚勳
Terry Jiang 江振愷 as young Shang Xun
Hong Hua Wei 洪華葦 as Bai Wen Liang 白文良
Zhao Yi Hu 趙一虎 as young Wen Liang
Lin He Xuan 林鶴軒 as Zhou Wen Xin 周文信
Erica Lai 賴柏蓉 as Niu Niu 妞妞
Michael Yang 楊昇達 as Ceng Ren Yi 曾仁毅
Leila Tang 唐雨韓 as Lin Qian Yu (Xiao Qian) 林倩玉 (小倩)
Isabella Chien 簡莉紋 as Su Fei 蘇菲
Zhu Jia Wei 朱家緯 as Bai Yi Xin (Xiao Xin) 白藝心 (小心)
Hui Chih Yeh 葉蕙芝 as Gao Hui Lan 高蕙蘭
Alina Cheng 鄭茵聲 as Guan Jing Jing 官晶晶
Lu Wen Xue 魯文學 as Lian Zhong Yan 連仲彥
Oscar Chiu 邱志宇 as young Zhong Yan

Guest actors

Zhu Sheng Ping 朱盛平 as Sun Xiao Shan 孫曉珊
?? as The Honest Guo 郭老實
Wei Fan An 魏凡安 as Fan An 凡安
Chen Yu 陳妤 as sound technician
Li Ying Jie 李盈潔 as Yi Xin's mother
Qin Si Lin 秦嗣林 as Qin Shi Lin 秦士林
Qiao Yin Hao 喬殷浩 as Wang Yu Ming 王裕明	
Pan Zhen De 潘振德 as Wang Bo Yi 汪博義
Xu Yi Ning 許逸寧 as Li Wan Yi 李婉儀
Chen Yi Zhong 陳怡仲 as Gao Yu Ci 高育慈
Eddy He 何怡德 as Zhang Guo Bin 張國賓
Masha Pan 潘君侖 as He Wei Li 何威立
Wish Chu 朱威旭 as Lawyer Ma 馬律師
AJ Lai 賴煜哲 as Reporter Yang 楊記者
Jane Hsu 許蓁蓁 as 客人
Gu Yun Yun 古昀昀 as Si De's mother
?? as Li Song Lin 李嵩霖
Mu Yan Yu 穆妍妤 as waiter

Soundtrack
  不愛你愛誰 by GTM
No Retreat 不退 by Amuyi Lu 呂薔
Safety First 安全第一 by Amuyi Lu 呂薔
The Soul Trader 販賣靈魂的人 by Amuyi Lu 呂薔
Signal 信號 by GTM
As We Are by Three Laws

Broadcast

Episode ratings
Competing shows on rival channels airing at the same time slot were:
CTS - Genius Go Go Go
FTV - Just Dance
CTV - Mr. Player

References

External links
Lion Pride TTV Website 
Lion Pride EBC Website 
 

2017 Taiwanese television series debuts
2018 Taiwanese television series endings
Taiwan Television original programming
Eastern Television original programming
Taiwanese romance television series
Taiwanese romantic comedy television series